Sladkovsky District  is an administrative district (raion), one of the twenty-two in Tyumen Oblast, Russia. As a municipal division, it is incorporated as Sladkovsky Municipal District. It is located in the southeast of the oblast and borders with Abatsky District in the north, Omsk Oblast in the east, Kazakhstan in the south, Kazansky District in the west, and with Ishimsky District in the northwest. Its administrative center is the rural locality (a selo) of Sladkovo. Population: 12,264 (2010 Census);  The population of Sladkovo accounts for 26.9% of the district's total population.

Geography

The program encouraging commercial fishing in the lake was initiated in 2007.

History
The district was established on November 12, 1923 within Ishim Okrug of Ural Oblast by merging Rozhdestvenskaya, Sladkovskaya, Usovskaya, and a part of Maslyanskaya Volosts. After a series of administrative transformations, abolitions, and restorations, the district was established in its present form on January 12, 1965 from eleven selsoviets of Maslyansky District of Tyumen Oblast.

Administration
As of 2013, the Head of the District Administration is Alexander Ivanov.

Agriculture
Agriculture plays a leading role in the economy of Sladkovsky District. The main (and equally represented) branches of agriculture are:
cattle breeding;
diary and meat production;
corn and grain legumes production.

Industry
In 2010, 218 million rubles worth of goods were produced in the district, which is 29% more than in 2009.
The following goods are produced by the district's factories:
bread and flour products;
fish production;
heat power;
wood production (wooden doors and window frames);
asphalt-concrete production.

Employment
The total workforce is 7,200 people, including 6,700 economically active. The employment is distributed as follows:
20% in agriculture;
16% in education;
11% in health and social system.

Unemployment level is low (0.1%).

Sladkovo wildlife reserve

This reserve is a result of fifteen years of hard work of restoring and preserving wildlife (Siberian Roe Deer, wild boars, marals, moose, and birds).

References

Notes

Sources

Districts of Tyumen Oblast